Albert Favre Zanuti was a Swiss-Italian watchmaker and entrepreneur, instrumental in the development of the watchmaking industry in Japan in the 1880s as a O-yatoi Gaikokujin.

Career overview 

Albert Zanuti was one of the first watchmakers to travel to Asia (1886) under the O-yatoi Gaikokujin program by the diplomatic invitation of Viscount Aoki Shūzō, and is remembered for his contribution to the early establishment of the watchmaking industry in Japan.

Between the 1870s and the 1880s, Albert Zanuti was one of the main suppliers of pocket watches to brands such as C&J Favre Brandt (founded by his business partner James Favre Brandt) and Siber & Brennwald (established by his acquaintance Kaspar Brennwald, whom he had known since the early days of Union Horlogère Suisse in La Chaux-de-Fonds). As a consequence of the trade agreement between Switzerland and Japan in 1864, both companies were now established in Yokohama, Japan,  relying on their Swiss based partners to guarantee supply not just of watches but also spare parts and machinery.

These initial exports of Swiss watches to Japan would be critical in establishing the Japanese watchmaking industry and the birth of the first generation of Japanese watchmakers, including Seijiro Sakurai and Kintarō Hattori (who began his career selling Swiss watches to local Japanese customers and would later found the globally renowned brand Seiko.

In 1887, after several successful years of exports to the US and Japan, Albert Zanuti officially established Zanuti & Cie.
Through the invitation of Viscount Aoki Shūzō and supported by his long time business partner James Favre Brandt, Albert Zanuti received a diplomatic invitation to take part in Japan's governmental plan for 'Transfers of technology and cultural ways', joining the so-called O-yatoi Gaikokujin.

Early life 
Albert Zanuti started his career as a cabinotier-watchmaker, supplying parts and Ébauche movements to established ‘Manufactures’ also known as Etablisseurs.
While working as a cabinotier, A. F. Zanuti would initiate his first sales internationally, exporting Swiss watches to jewelers across Europe and South America. Amongst his first orders were several gold pocket-watches sold to Gondolo & Labouriau.

Following on the footsteps of all major watchmakers and Swiss brands of that era, such as Antoni Patek (founder of Patek Philipp) and Jean-Marc Vacheron (founder of brand Vacheron Constantin, Zanuti travelled to the USA during the Gilded era looking to grow his exports and capitalize on the recent Gold rush and expanding Industrial revolution.

Albert Zanuti left the US in 1886 embarking from the port of Seattle (King County, Washington, United States) to Yokohama, Japan aboard the Ocean liner from the American Pacific Mail Steamship Company.

A. F. Zanuti would go on to establish one of the first foreign companies in Asia (Zanuti & Cie.) and was responsible for exporting some of the first Swiss wristwatches into several different Asian countries.

Alongside with François Perregaux and James Favre Brandt, Albert Zanuti was one of the pioneers of watchmaking in Japan.

Personal life 

Born 'Alberto Zanuti', he became known in the watchmaking circles of French speaking Switzerland as 'Albert' (the French variation of the Italian name 'Alberto').

He was born to an Italian father and Swiss mother near Morsano al Tagliamento, Italy, a small town in the region of Veneto at a five-hour driving distance from Switzerland.
After relocating to his mother's hometown in Switzerland, Albert Zanuti became a watchmaking apprentice at the age of 14, a passion he would pursue for the rest of his life.

Albert Zanuti married Swiss nurse Alice Favre, with whom he had 3 children: Gianni Zanuti, Isabella Zanuti (who would adopt her husband's surname Bianchi) and Anna Maria Zanuti (who would take her husband's surname Sorrentino).

See also 
 Foreign government advisors in Meiji Japan
 François Perregaux
 Meiji period
 Foreign relations of Japan

References

Books 
 The first Swiss watchmakers in Asia, chapter by François Chaille, Girard-Perregaux, Editions Flammarion, 2004, 
 Documenting the Meiji Era in Japan (1868-1912), Michael R. Auslin, 
 Swiss Imports from Yokohama and Japanese Watch Manufacturers: The Market for Watches in Meiji Era Japan, 1869 – 1912, by Pierre-Yves Donzé
 Turning Points in Japanese History, the Meiji era, Pag. 71-102, edited by Bert Edstrom, 2002
 Notable Oyatoi gaikokujin, by Akashi Shoten , 
 Historical records on foreign residents in Japan, Nyūkan Kyōkai (Tōkyō), ISSN 0915-4876
 Documenting the European Society in Yokohama from 1871 to 1908. Japan weekly mail (OCoLC) 882879033
 The first Swiss watchmakers in Asia, François Chaille, Girard-Perregaux, Editions Flammarion, 2004, 
 Le Japon et l'industrie horlogère suisse. Un cas de transfert de technologie durant les années 1880- 1940, Author; Pierre-Yves Donzé.
 Mario M. Einaudi, and Jennifer Allan Goldman. "The Pacific Mail Steamship Company Collection." Southern California Quarterly 94, no. 4 (2012): 407-09.
 Library of Congress, Yokohama publications on its European Society from 1870-1915 Serial number: (OCoLC) ca06001290
 Rolf-Harald Wippich: Japan als Kolonie? Max von Brandts Hokkaido-Projekt 1865/67, Hamburg 1997, .

Swiss watchmakers (people)
Swiss clockmakers
 
F
F
F